Events from the year 1585 in Sweden

Incumbents
 Monarch – John III

Events

 - Wedding between the King and Gunilla Bielke.

Births

Deaths

 5 November - Pontus De la Gardie, general  (1520)
 - Lucretia Gyllenhielm, illegitimate royal child  (1561)

References

 
Years of the 16th century in Sweden
Sweden